Evolution: The Game of Intelligent Life, also known as Genetic Evolution: The Race for Intelligent Life in Germany and Evolução: O Jogo da Vida in Brazil, is a life simulation and real-time strategy computer game that allows players to experience, guide, and control evolution from an isometric view on either historical earth or on randomly generated worlds while racing against computer opponents to reach the top of the evolution chain, and gradually evolving the player's animals to reach the "grand goal of intelligent life".

Gameplay

Players select different ages to play through, including the Labyrinthodontia, or the first amphibians through to the evolution of the Age of Mammals. Each species has points that players can spend on adapting or evolving their creature populations, which are represented by animated icons of that creature. The more points a player spends on a field for a species, the quicker it evolves, becomes better at feeding (and growing in number faster), or better at fighting off predators. When a player evolves a creature, one can pick a population to be upgraded to the evolution one chooses. Each creature has a different set of evolution paths, and some can evolve into six or more different creatures. The world grows as the game advances, with land masses drifting and terrain shifting. As the player evolves the selected creatures, the player slowly advances in the complexity of the animals, eventually reaching intelligent life. Usually, the first player to do this is the victor (standard rules).

The game starts from basal tetrapods, the very first land dwellers: amphibians. At the gain of the game, each player starts with one population of a species of prehistoric amphibian—e.g. Ichthyostega, Tulerpeton, and Acanthostega. Gradually, if the player monitors the species' progress and moves them to more appropriate habitats and climate zones, the selected species will feed, breed, and prosper. From that secure population who can then evolve more advanced and adaptable creatures, along with continental drift and climate change, the other, older, and more primitive species will be rendered obsolete, and their creatures will die out.

As the player advances their creatures, extinctions may wipe out populations of some species, while others may not be affected at all. Each species has a drop-down menu, which displays all the more advanced creatures that this particular species can evolve into. Eventually, when the player reaches intelligent and advanced animals, the menu will display certain creatures that can then evolve into the standard intelligent life of civilization builders. The line of intelligent species doesn't have to be humans (e.g. Australopithecus, Homo habilis, Homo sapiens). The player can also evolve other intelligent species who are fictional or highly speculative. For example, if a player evolves one of the creatures into an elephant, one can access the elephant line, and gradually evolve that elephant into Elephasapiens which is a species of intelligent life, thus winning the game. Elephasapiens of course, is fictional and speculative. Other species of intelligent life within the game are parrot men, wombat men, and dino men.

Once a player evolves intelligent life, the game ends and scores are added up and displayed, although the player who evolved intelligent life is guaranteed victory. Score points are given to players who make evolutionary breakthroughs. For example, evolving the first reptile, mammal, or dinosaur is worth bonus points.

The game can either be played alone or against the computer. With opponents, the game has another side to it. Each animal has the ability to evolve defense, and other animals (predatory creatures) controlled by the players, can fight each other's creatures, thus wiping out an enemy population, reducing competition and weakening the opponent. To fend off these attacks, the other player can, as said earlier, evolve defenses against the opponent's predators.

Critical reception 
Inside Games thought it was a perfect simulation. Electric Play felt the game was both educational and interesting. Happy Puppy thought the game had much replay value.

The reviewer from Pyramid #30 (March/April, 1998) stated that "A Discovery Channel Multimedia/Crossover Technologies product, Evolution shares the Discovery success strategy for straddling the road between education and entertainment. It's fun, and I actually learned something."

See also
Spore
Impossible Creatures
Black & White
L.O.L.: Lack of Love
Seventh Cross: Evolution
E.V.O.: Search for Eden
Creatures
SimLife
SimEarth

References

External links 
 
 Main page
 Designer notes

1997 video games
Biological simulation video games
God games
Panhistorical video games
Real-time strategy video games
Video games with isometric graphics
Windows games
Windows-only games
Prehistoric life in popular culture
Prehistoric people in popular culture
Greg Costikyan games
Dinosaurs in video games
Multiplayer and single-player video games
Video games about evolution
Video games developed in the United States
Video games set in prehistory